Croatia Airlines currently flies to 27 destinations in 23 countries. Croatia Airlines originally started with a domestic route network, flying from Zagreb to Split in 1991. In 1992, the airline started international service flying MD-82s to Frankfurt.

The Zagreb-Sarajevo route began in 1996 and was the first civil air route flown out of Sarajevo since the beginning of the Bosnian War.

Destinations

References

Lists of airline destinations
Croatia transport-related lists
Star Alliance destinations

Annotations